Sir William Courtenay (June 1553 – 24 June 1630) of Powderham in Devon was a prominent member of the Devonshire gentry. He was Sheriff of Devon in 1579–80 and received the rare honour of having been three times elected MP for the prestigious county seat (Devon) in 1584, 1589 and 1601.

Origins
He was the only son and heir of Sir William Courtenay ( – 1557) of Powderham, MP for Plympton Erle in 1555, by Elizabeth, daughter of John Paulet, 2nd Marquess of Winchester. His sister Jane married Sir Nicholas Parker. After his father's death, his mother subsequently married Sir Henry Ughtred, son of Sir Anthony Ughtred and his second wife, Elizabeth Seymour, sister to Jane, third consort of Henry VIII.

Career
In 1557 at the age of 4, he succeeded his father. He trained as a lawyer in the Middle Temple. He was knighted on 25 March 1576, served as Sheriff of Devon for 1579–80 and was also involved in the Munster Plantation in Ireland in the 1580s, being granted Desmond Hall and Castle in Newcastle West. Sir William was elected as a Member of Parliament for Devon in 1584, 1589 and 1601. In 1831 he was recognised by a retrospective decision of the House of Lords as having been de jure 3rd Earl of Devon.

Marriages and issue

He married three times:

First marriage
He married firstly, around 18 January 1573, Elizabeth Manners, a daughter of Henry Manners, 2nd Earl of Rutland, and by her had seven sons and three daughters:
 Sir William Courtenay, (died 1603), eldest son and heir apparent, knighted 1599, died without progeny and predeceased his father.
 Francis Courtenay, (1576 – 3 Jun 1638), of Powderham, MP, 2nd but eldest surviving son and heir. In 1831 he was recognised retrospectively as having been de jure 4th Earl of Devon.
 Thomas Courtenay   
 Sir George Oughtred Courtenay(born ), 1st Baronet of Newcastle, Limerick, married by 1616, Catherine, daughter of Francis Berkeley of Askeaton, Limerick, and by her had three sons:
 Sir William Courtenay (born ), 2nd Baronet
 Francis Courtenay (born )
 Morris Courtenay  
 John Courtenay
 Alexander Courtenay
 Edward Courtenay
 Margaret Courtenay, eldest daughter, whose mural monument with kneeling effigy survives in St Mary Magdalene's Church, Richmond, Surrey. She married firstly Sir Warwick Hele (1568-1626) of Wembury in Devon, MP, secondly Sir John Chudleigh (born 1584), knighted by King Charles I 22 Sept 1625, 3rd son of John Chudleigh (1565-1589) of Ashton, Devon, and younger brother of Sir George Chudleigh, 1st Baronet (d.1656).
 Bridget Courtenay
 Elizabeth Courtenay, 3rd daughter, who married Sir William Wrey, 1st Baronet of Tawstock in Devon. Her father's arms survive, impaled by Wrey, on the monument of her father-in-law John Wrey (d.1597) in Tawstock Church.

Second marriage
He married secondly Elizabeth (d. 1598), a daughter of Sir George Sydenham of Combe Sydenham in Somerset and widow of Sir Francis Drake (d. 1596).

Third marriage 
Thirdly he married Jane Hill, a daughter of Robert Hill of Taunton, Somerset.

Death
He died in London on 24 June 1630 and was buried in Powderham Church, Devon. He was succeeded by his son, Francis.

References

Sources

External links
 Hasler, P.W. (1981). "Courtenay, Sir William I (1553-1630), of Powderham, Devon". In Hasler, P.W. (ed.). The History of Parliament: The House of Commons 1558–1603 at historyofparliamentonline.org

1553 births
1630 deaths
Members of the Parliament of England (pre-1707) for Devon
High Sheriffs of Devon
English MPs 1584–1585
English MPs 1589
English MPs 1601
Earls of Devon (1553 creation)
16th-century English landowners